Niakhar Arrondissement (Serer proper : Ñaaxar or Ñakhar, other variation : Nakhar) is an arrondissement of the Fatick Department in the Fatick Region of Senegal.

In religion and mythology

According to Serer cosmogony, the Saas tree (acacia albida) which is considered to be a fertility tree and a tree of life among the Serers is abundant in this area which assist in crop rotation and intensive farming.  The Jolax matriclan — one of the old Serer matriclan who are enshrined in Serer mythology and legend, are also reported to be heavily concentrated in Niakhar Arrondissement. As of 1983, at least 375 people are reported to be members of this clan.

Subdivisions
The arrondissement is divided administratively into rural communities and in turn into villages.

References

Arrondissements of Senegal
Fatick Region